Ras al-Khashufah is a small town in northwestern Syria, administratively part of the Tartus Governorate. It is located between Safita  and Tartus. According to the Syria Central Bureau of Statistics (CBS), Ras al-Khashufah had a population of 5,499 in the 2004 census. It is the administrative center of the Ras al-Khashufaf Subdistrict (nahiyah) which consisted of 16 localities with a collective population of 21,586. Its inhabitants are predominantly Alawites.

References

Populated places in Safita District
Towns in Syria
Alawite communities in Syria